T. Sventon praktiserande privatdetektiv ("T. Sventon, Practicing Private Investigator") was the Sveriges Television's Christmas calendar in 1989.

Plot 
The stories are based on the books about private investigator Ture Sventon, his secretary Miss Jansson and the villain Ville Vessla. The adventures take place at various places around the world, including Lingonboda, the Arab world, London and Stockholm.

Video 
The series was released to VHS in 1992 and to DVD in the year 2000.

References

External links 
  at SVT Play 
 
 

1989 Swedish television series debuts
1989 Swedish television series endings
Stockholm in fiction
Sveriges Television's Christmas calendar
Television shows set in London
Television shows set in Sweden